Epideira nodulosa is a species of sea snail, a marine gastropod mollusk in the family Horaiclavidae.

Description

Distribution
This marine species is endemic to Australia and occurs off New South Wales.

References

 Laseron, C. F. (1954). Revision of the New South Wales Turridae. Royal Zoological Society of New South Wales Australian Zoological Handbook. Sydney: Royal Zoological Society of New South Wales. 56 pp., 12 pls
 Wilson, B. 1994. Australian marine shells. Prosobranch gastropods. Kallaroo, WA : Odyssey Publishing Vol. 2 370 pp. 
 Taylor, J.D., Kantor, Y.I. & Sysoev, A.V. 1993. Foregut anatomy, feeding mechanisms, relationships and classification of the Conoidea (=Toxoglossa) (Gastropoda). Bulletin of the British Museum (Natural History) Zoology 59: 125–170 
 Tucker, J.K. 2004. Catalog of Recent and fossil turrids (Mollusca: Gastropoda). Zootaxa 682: 1–1295 

nodulosa
Gastropods described in 1954